Jannatul Ferdous Oishee (born 27 August 2000) known mononymously as Oishee, is a Bangladeshi model, actor and beauty pageant titleholder. Oishee was crowned Miss World Bangladesh 2018. She represented Bangladesh at the Miss World 2018 in Sanya, China on 8 December 2018, and was placed in the top 30 among 118 contestants.

Early life
Jannatul Ferdous Oishee was born on 27 August 2000 in Pirojpur, Barisal, Bangladesh. Her father Abdul Hai is a social worker, mother Afroza Hosne Ara is a school teacher, and she has an elder sister named Sashee.

Education 
She completed her higher secondary education from Matibhanga Degree College, Pirojpur. As of August 2021, she is a student at Independent University, Bangladesh.

Pageantry 
Oishee was crowned Miss World Bangladesh 2018 at the International Convention City Bashundhara (ICCB) in Dhaka. She won the title by defeating 30,000 contestants which gained her entry to the Miss World 2018 pageant.

In the 68th edition of Miss World 2018 in Sanya, China, Oishee was voted as the winner among six contestants of group 6 head-to-head Challenge by public vote. The other contestants in her group were China, British Virgin Islands, Denmark, Brazil and Ireland. In the final round of head-to-head challenge, she was chosen by all three judges (Stephanie Del Valle, Manushi Chhillar, Megan Young) to win over Miss Nigeria, which placed Oishee in top 30 among 118 contestants of Miss World 2018.

Filmography

References

External links
 
 
 

2000 births
Living people
Bangladeshi beauty pageant winners
Bangladeshi female models
Miss World 2018 delegates